Gun for You is the debut album by The Greenhornes, released in 1999.

Track listing
All tracks written by The Greenhornes, except where noted.
 "The End of the Night" - 1:53
 "No More" - 2:24
 "Good Times" - 2:13
 "Wake Me, Shake Me" (Al Kooper) - 3:37
 "Hold Me" - 3:52
 "My Baby's Alright" - 2:32
 "No Friend of Mine" - 3:09
 "Show Me Love" - 3:34
 "So Cold" - 3:44
 "What a Fool" - 3:07
 "Going to the River" (William York) - 2:50
 "I've Been Down" - 5:14

Personnel
Craig Fox - guitars, lead vocals
Patrick Keeler - drums, percussion, artwork
Jack Lawrence - bass
Brian Olive - guitars, vocals
Jared McKinney - organs, vocals
Chris Koltay - mixing
John Curley - engineering
Dave Davis - mastering

References

The Greenhornes albums
1999 debut albums